This is a list of lakes in Zambia.

Lake Bangweulu
Lake Kariba
Lake Kashiba
Lake Ishiba Ng'andu
Mofwe Lagoon
Lake Mweru
Lake Mweru Wantipa
Lake Tanganyika
 Rift Valley lakes

Lakes

Zambia